Change Nothing is a 2009 documentary directed by Portuguese filmmaker Pedro Costa. The documentary focuses on the French singer Jeanne Balibar in rehearsal and concert as seen through Costa's characteristically long, stark takes.

External links
Ne change rien at the Pacific Film Archive

 Finding Oneself in the Dark: Costa’s NE CHANGE RIEN, Jonathan Rosenbaum's review

2000s French-language films
French documentary films
2009 films
Films directed by Pedro Costa
Documentary films about singers
Documentary films about women in music
2000s French films